Socialist Revolution Party of Benin was a Marxist-Leninist political party operating in Togo and Dahomey. It was founded in Cotonou on July 28, 1959. The party united Juvento dissidents from Togo and Dahomeyan trade unionists. The founding declaration of the party was signed by Max Mensah Aithson (Togo) and Théophile Béhanzin (Dahomey).

References

Communist parties in Benin
Defunct political parties in Togo
Defunct political parties in Benin
1959 establishments in the Republic of Dahomey
Political parties established in 1959